"You Do Something To Me" is a song by Dum Dums, released as their 3rd single in 2000. It was also included on their album It Goes Without Saying.

Track listing
 CD1
(Released September 11, 2000)
 "You Do Something to Me" - 3:47
 "It Goes Without Saying" - 2:50
 "Robot Boy" - 2:41

 CD2
(Released September 11, 2000)
 "You Do Something to Me" - 3:50
 "I Can't Stand It" - 3:43
 "Running Away" - 3:35
 "You Do Something to Me (Video)"

Chart performance
"You Do Something to Me" entered the UK Singles Chart the week of 11-09-2000 at #27.

References 

Dum Dums (band) songs
2000 singles
2000 songs
Song articles with missing songwriters